The 1997 European Baseball Championship was won by Italy. It was held in France.

Standings

European Baseball Championship
European Baseball Championship
E
1997 in French sport